Hoseynabad-e Tang-e Khomar (also Romanized as Ḩoseynābād-e Tang-e Khomār; also known as Ḩoseynābād) is a village in Now Bandegan Rural District, Now Bandegan District, Fasa County, Fars Province, Iran. At the 2006 census, its population was 16, in 4 families.

References 

Populated places in Fasa County